Nihill is a surname. Some notable people with the surname are:

John Nihill (1850–1908), Irish-born soldier in the U.S. Army
Julie Nihill (born 1957), Australian actress 
Paul Nihill (1939–2020), British race walker
Philippa Nihill, bass player for the Underground Lovers
Torsten Nihill, drummer for Omega Lithium
 Dave Nihill, Irish comedian

English-language surnames